Anania is the genus name of:

 Anania (moth), a genus of moths in the family Crambidae.
 Anania (foraminifera), a genus of shelled protists in the family Ananiidae.